Gaston Joseph Clement Marie Salmon (5 March 1878 – 30 April 1918) was a Belgian épée, foil, and sabre fencer.  He was Jewish.

Early and personal life
Salmon was born in Marcinelle, in the city of Charleroi, in Belgium, and was Jewish, his parents being Emile Telesphore Joseph and his wife Antoinette Cecile Josephe Marie (nee Crispin). He married Ferdinande Betsy Ermens, and lived in Etterbeek. In World War I he enlisted in the Belgian Army on 14 May 1917. He was killed in an air raid by a German plane at Veurne, Belgium, in April 1918 aged 40, and is buried in the Belgian Military Cemetery in Westvleteren.

Olympic fencing career
Salmon represented Belgium at the 1912 Stockholm Olympics, competing in three events, winning a gold medal in team épée. He also competed in two individual events, but was eliminated in the first round of both the individual foil and individual sabre. The team included artist Jacques Ochs.

See also
List of select Jewish fencers

References

Further reading

External links
Olympic record
Jews in Sports bio

1878 births
1918 deaths
Belgian male fencers
Belgian épée fencers
Jewish Belgian sportspeople
Jewish male épée fencers
Jewish male foil fencers
Jewish male sabre fencers
Olympic fencers of Belgium
Fencers at the 1912 Summer Olympics
Olympic gold medalists for Belgium
Place of birth missing
Olympic medalists in fencing
Medalists at the 1912 Summer Olympics
Belgian military personnel killed in World War I
Deaths by airstrike during World War I
Belgian Army personnel of World War I
20th-century Belgian people